Longford–Westmeath is a parliamentary constituency represented in Dáil Éireann, the lower house of the Irish parliament or Oireachtas. The constituency elects 4 deputies (Teachtaí Dála, commonly known as TDs) on the system of proportional representation by means of the single transferable vote (PR-STV).

History and boundaries

The constituency previously existed from 1921 to 1937 and from 1948 to 1992, but was abolished for the 1992 general election. It was re-created by the Electoral (Amendment) Act 2005 which gave effect to the 2004 Constituency Commission Report on Dáil Constituencies, and was first used in its current form at the 2007 general election. It contains the County Longford portion of the former Longford–Roscommon constituency, and most of the former Westmeath constituency apart from the north-eastern area around Castlepollard and Delvin, which became part of the new Meath West constituency.

The Electoral (Amendment) (Dáil Constituencies) Act 2017 defines the constituency as:

TDs

TDs 1921–1937

TDs 1948–1992

TDs since 2007

Elections

2020 general election

2016 general election
Final result following a recount.

2014 by-election

2011 general election

2007 general election

1989 general election

1987 general election

November 1982 general election

February 1982 general election

1981 general election

1977 general election

1973 general election

1970 by-election
Following the death of Fianna Fáil TD Patrick Lenihan, a by-election was held on 14 April 1970. The seat was won by the Fine Gael candidate Patrick Cooney.

1969 general election

1965 general election

1961 general election

1957 general election

1954 general election

1951 general election

1948 general election

1933 general election

1932 general election

1930 by-election
Following the death of Fianna Fáil TD James Killane, a by-election was held on 13 June 1930. The seat was won by the Fianna Fáil candidate James Geoghegan.

September 1927 general election

June 1927 general election

1923 general election
Michael Gallagher notes that newspapers at the time were not consistent with the exact figures of the first count so there may have been slight differences to the below. Full figures for the second to the ninth counts are unavailable. The order of eliminations was O'Farrell on 138 votes, Carrigy 735, Groarke 924, Philips 1,203, Gavin 1,244, Redmond 1,396, Victory 1,851, Wilson 2,689 and Garahan 2,793.

1922 general election

1921 general election

|}

See also
Dáil constituencies
Elections in the Republic of Ireland
Politics of the Republic of Ireland
List of Dáil by-elections
List of political parties in the Republic of Ireland

References

Dáil constituencies
Politics of County Longford
Politics of County Westmeath
1921 establishments in Ireland
1937 disestablishments in Ireland
Constituencies established in 1921
Constituencies disestablished in 1937
1948 establishments in Ireland
1992 disestablishments in Ireland
Constituencies established in 1948
Constituencies disestablished in 1992
2007 establishments in Ireland
Constituencies established in 2007